{{safesubst:#invoke:RfD|||month = March
|day = 20
|year = 2023
|time = 18:25
|timestamp = 20230320182523

|content=
REDIRECT Supreme Council of the Republic of Georgia

}}